Godamchaur is a village and former Village Development Committee that is now part of Godawari Municipality in Province No. 3 of central Nepal. At the time of the 1991 Nepal census it had a population of 3868 in 645 individual households. It has 9 small wards in this village development committee. Saathali (ward 6) is mostly inhabited by Newars.

References

External links
UN map of the municipalities of Lalitpur District

Populated places in Lalitpur District, Nepal